Mullah Mu'hammad Shamez-ud'din Ahmed (Arabic, Urdu:شمݥالدين أحمد in British India, 1913 – 1968 in East Pakistan) was the hereditary Qadi of Natore, seated at Singra Upazila in the erstwhile Indian Empire (and then East Pakistan, and finally present day Bangladesh).

Biography

Born in the British Empire before the First World War, he was the son of Mullah Muhammad Jasim  ud'din Ahmed, who was a relative of Muhammad Faiz-ud'din Ahmed, the father of Muhammad Zunaid Ahmed. His paternal line was descended from Mullah Shah Badakhshi and were minor aristocrats (Mullahbare Qadi family); his father, a landowner in Shercole, maintained residences in the Bombay Presidency (near the present day Indian city of Mumbai) and in Darjeeling (then part of Nepal).

He attended Naogaon K.D. Government High School from where he matriculated in the mid 1930s. He was an only son, and his father died in his youth at 1923, and his mother, Khadeja Khanem was regent during his minority.

Succession

The title Mullah used by the family was used to show respect to educated Muslim leaders of the clergy. The rulers of Muslim India used the institution of the Qadi, who was given the responsibility for total administrative, judicial and fiscal control over a territory or a town. He would maintain all the civil records as well.

He would also retain a small army or force to ensure that his rulings are enforced. In most cases, the kazi (qadi) would pass on the title and position to his son, descendant or a very close relative. Over the centuries, this profession became a title within the families, and the power remained within one family in a region. Throughout South Asia, various such families are found who descended through their ancestors and retained the lands and position. Each family is known by the town or city that their ancestors controlled.

Family
In 1935, he was married to Gulbadan Begum of Natore, the eldest daughter of Jalaluddin Mirza, the Zamindar of Natore. He had four sons and two daughters who survived to adulthood. He died at Rajshahi Medical College in 1968 and is buried in the Singranatore estate next to his wife, and parents. He was succeeded by his oldest son.
Akhtar Hussain the former General Manager of Bangladesh National Oils.
Gole Afroz Bengali socialite and wife of MM Rahmatullah.
Abu Naser Muhammad Asad-uz-zaman, a professor in Bogra, died 1997.
Colonel Muhammad Shahid Sarwar, military commander of Rajshahi, the family's home state
Lieutenant Colonel Muhammad Sarwar Alam, military officer.
Gulroze Nahar Chowdhury, a lawyer.

Sources

Bibliography

1913 births
1968 deaths
20th-century Indian Muslims
Pakistani Muslims
Sharia judges
20th-century Bengalis
Bangladeshi people of Mughal descent